Bill Moss (22 May 1931 – 25 June 2007) was an American Gospel music singer.

Biography

Early life
Moss was born in 1931 in Selma, Alabama, and sang in a choir led by his older sister the late Dr. Mattie Moss Clark.

Musical career

Bill Moss & The Celestials
He moved to Detroit, Michigan and formed The Celestials with his wife Essie Moss. Bill Moss & the Celestials would perform with acts such as The Staple Singers and Mighty Clouds of Joy at venues such as the Apollo Theater in Harlem. The Celestials were one of the first gospel groups to use electric instruments.   Their best known songs include "Turn It Over to Jesus", "Everything is Going to be Alright" and "The Way We Use to Have Church."

Awards
He was inducted into the International Gospel Music Hall of Fame in 2004.

Musical influence
Moss' two sons are currently involved in Gospel music: Bill Moss Jr. and James (performs as J. Moss). His sister, Mattie Moss Clark, and nieces, The Clark Sisters, are also Gospel music singers.

References

External links
 International Gospel Music Hall of Fame 

1931 births
2007 deaths
American performers of Christian music
20th-century African-American male singers
American gospel singers
African-American Christians
American Pentecostals
Members of the Church of God in Christ
Deaths from emphysema
Singers from Detroit
Musicians from Boston
Musicians from Selma, Alabama